is a Japanese chicken meatball most often cooked yakitori style (but also can be fried, baked, or boiled) and sometimes covered in a sweet soy or yakitori tare, which is often mistaken for teriyaki sauce.

Summary 
Thickeners are added to ground material such as beef, pork, or fowl, and occasionally fish. The mixture is then kneaded and molded into a dumpling or skewered.

It also refers to a fish meatball, which is added to hot soup and called , or fish ball soup. Tsukune is also enjoyed as tsukune nabe, a Japanese steamboat dish with local varieties found in regions in Japan.

Traditionally, a fish fillet was ground using  grinding-bowl in Japan, but blenders are now typically used.

Tsukune are traditionally placed on a bamboo skewer grilled over fire or charcoal but can also be prepared unskewered in a frying pan on the stove top.

Preparation 
Thickeners such as egg, crushed yam, and bread crumbs are added after the meat is mashed or minced finely, along with seasonings such as ground ginger root, salt, and soy sauce. The mixture is shaped into dumplings or meat sticks.

Finely chopped garden vegetables are mixed into the minced meat to taste. Vegetables and herbs such as Welsh onion, red perilla, and at times, chopped cartilage of fowl may be added to create a crunchy texture.

Varieties

 Boil: , a dish cooked at the table
 Broil: , broiled or char-broiled dishes, including barbecued meatball
 Fry:  or deep-fried
 Stew: ,  stewed with vegetables and herbs

See also

 Dango
 Gyoza
 Kebab
 Sate
 Souvlaki
 List of chicken dishes

References

Surimi
Meatballs
Japanese chicken dishes
Fish dishes